This is a list of airlines currently operating in Libya.

See also
 List of defunct airlines of Libya
 List of airlines
 List of air carriers banned in the European Union

Libya
Airlines
Airlines
Libya